Toon van Driel (born 16 February 1945, Amsterdam) is a Dutch cartoonist, comics writer and comics artist, best known for his comics series F.C. Knudde, about an incompetent association football team, and De Stamgasten, which features anthropomorphic animals telling corny jokes in a bar. He is the winner of the 1988 Stripschapprijs. Van Driel was also the original writer of Eric Schreurs' comic strip Joop Klepzeiker.

References

External link

1945 births
Living people
Dutch cartoonists
Dutch comics artists
Dutch comics writers
Dutch humorists
Artists from Amsterdam
Winners of the Stripschapsprijs